Tha Mae Lop is a village and tambon (subdistrict) of Mae Tha District, in Lamphun Province, Thailand. In 2005 it had a population of  3,032 people. The tambon contains six villages.

References

Tambon of Lamphun province
Populated places in Lamphun province